Platforma 69-y km is a rural locality (a settlement) in Sosnovskoye Rural Settlement of Priozersky District, Leningrad Oblast, of northwest Russia. Population:

References 

Rural localities in Leningrad Oblast